Sardar Dost Muhammad Khosa (born 22 October 1973) is a Pakistani politician affiliated with Pakistan People's Party. He was appointed as the  Chief Minister of Punjab on 12 April 2008, after winning Punjab Provincial Seat 244 Dera Ghazi Khan in the general election, serving until 8 June 2008. He joined the Pakistan People's Party (PPP) on 22 December 2018.

Early life
Khosa is the son of former Punjab Governor and senior political leader of Pakistan Sardar Zulfiqar Ali Khosa. He was born in Lahore on 22 October 1973.

Khosa received his primary education from Aitchison College Lahore, and graduated from Lincoln's Inn, London.

Political career 
Khosa was first elected as MPA when his father, Sardar Zulfiqar Khosa, vacated a provincial seat after taking oath as Punjab Governor in August 1999. He had also served as UC Nazim of Churratta, D.G. Khan and later as Naib District Nazim D.G. Khan until the general election in 2008.Later, he was appointed the Chief Minister of Punjab for just 3 Years. Khosa also has the honour of becoming the Youngest ever Chief Minister of Punjab aged 32. He has also served as, Minister for Trade and Commerce, Punjab, Minister for Provincial Affairs, Punjab and other Government Offices.

Personal 
Khosa belongs to the Balochi people. He is the youngest of three sons of former Punjab Governor Sardar Zulfiqar Ali Khosa.

See also 
Baloch people

References

External links 
 Profile: Dost Muhammad Khosa

Baloch politicians
Chief Ministers of Punjab, Pakistan
1973 births
Pakistan Muslim League (N) politicians
Pakistan People's Party politicians
Aitchison College alumni
Government College University, Lahore alumni
Beaconhouse National University alumni
People from Dera Ghazi Khan District
Living people